Love, Victor is an American teen comedy drama streaming television series created by Isaac Aptaker and Elizabeth Berger, inspired by and set in the same world as the 2018 film Love, Simon. The series premiered on June 17, 2020, on Hulu and ended on June 15, 2022, with 28 episodes over three seasons. It is produced by 20th Television, with Aptaker and Berger serving as showrunners.

Michael Cimino stars as Victor, a teen from a half Puerto Rican, half Colombian-American family living in Atlanta, alongside George Sear, Rachel Hilson, Bebe Wood, Anthony Turpel, Isabella Ferreira, Ana Ortiz, James Martinez, Mason Gooding, and Mateo Fernandez. Nick Robinson, who starred as the titular Simon in the original film, produces and narrates the series. The second season premiered on June 11, 2021. In July 2021, the series was renewed for a third and final season which premiered on June 15, 2022, and was released simultaneously on Disney+. During the course of the series, 28 episodes of Love, Victor were released over three seasons, between June 17, 2020, and June 15, 2022.

Premise
The first season focuses on a new student at Creekwood High School, Victor. The series follows his journey of self-discovery: facing challenges at home and struggling with his sexual orientation. He reaches out to Simon when it seems too difficult for him to navigate through high school.

The second season deals with the aftermath of his coming out and follows Victor as he navigates through the challenging times with his family, while also dealing with his relationship with Benji, which is tested multiple times, due in part to Victor's family.

In the third season, although they are still in their junior year, Victor, and his friends and family alike find themselves in certain situations and make some tough, yet life-changing decisions for their future outside of Creekwood.

Cast and characters

Main

 Michael Cimino as Victor Salazar: A new student at Creekwood High School, struggling with his identity surrounding his sexual orientation and adjusting to a new city
 Rachel Hilson as Mia Brooks: Victor's smart friend and ex-girlfriend who has a quick wit and an easy laugh. They dated before Victor came out.
 Anthony Turpel as Felix Westen: Victor's awkward neighbor and best friend
 Bebe Wood as Lake Meriwether: Mia's social media-obsessed best friend. She dated Felix before coming out as queer in the third season and starts dating Lucy.
 Mason Gooding as Andrew Spencer: Creekwood's cocky and popular basketball-loving jock
 George Sear as Benji Campbell: Victor's openly gay, confident and charming crush at Creekwood High School. He is Victor's first boyfriend.
 Isabella Ferreira as Pilar Salazar: Victor's gothic younger sister troubled with her new life
 Mateo Fernandez as Adrian Salazar: Victor's little brother
 James Martinez as Armando Salazar: Victor's father, a blue-collar man who works hard for his family
 Ana Ortiz as Isabel Salazar: Victor's mother who is under a lot of pressure after a move to a new city
 Anthony Keyvan as Rahim, Pilar's friend who comes from a religious Iranian Muslim family who develops a crush on Victor. He later begins a relationship with Connor. (season 3; recurring season 2)
 Ava Capri as Lucy, Benji's friend and Andrew's ex-girlfriend who later becomes romantically involved with Lake (season 3; recurring season 2)

Nick Robinson, reprising his role as Simon Spier from Love, Simon, mostly appears via voice-over, narrating Simon's messages to Victor. Robinson appears as Simon in person in the eighth episode of the first season and the tenth episode of the second season. Robinson did not reprise his role in the third season.

Recurring 
 Mekhi Phifer as Harold Brooks, Mia's father
 Abigail Killmeier as Wendy, a theater student who Felix takes as his date to the Spring Fling (seasons 1–2)
 Charlie Hall as Kieran, one of Andrew's close friends and a member of the basketball team 
 AJ Carr as Teddy, another one of Andrew's close friends and also a member of the basketball team
 Sophia Bush as Veronica, Mia's father's new girlfriend, and later wife, who runs a non-profit organization for women (seasons 1–2; guest season 3)
 Lukas Gage as Derek, Benji's ex-boyfriend (season 1; guest season 2)
 Betsy Brandt as Dawn Westen, Felix's mother who suffers from mental health issues (season 2–3)
 Julie Benz as Shelby, Armando's new friend and later love interest he met at a PFLAG meeting (season 2)
 Nico Greetham as Nick, a gay boy who attends the Salazars' church (season 3)
 Tyler Lofton as Connor, a waiter and love interest for Rahim (season 3)

Guest
 Leslie Grossman as Georgina Meriwether, a local news host and Lake's mother 
 Andy Richter as Coach Ford, the physical education teacher and varsity basketball coach
 Beth Littleford as Sarah, the manager of the coffee house where Victor and Benji work (seasons 1–2)
 Will Ropp as Wyatt, one of Andrew's close friends (seasons 1–2)
 Ali Wong as Ms. Thomas, Creekwood's sex education teacher (season 1)
 Steven Heisler as Roger, Armando's former boss with whom Isabel had an affair (season 1)
 Keiynan Lonsdale as Bram Greenfeld, Simon Spier's boyfriend, reprising his role from Love, Simon (season 1)
 Katya Zamolodchikova as herself, performing at the gay club Messy Boots in NYC (season 1)
 Tommy Dorfman as Justin, Bram and Simon's roommate (season 1)
 Natasha Rothwell as Ms. Albright, vice principal at Creekwood, previously the school's drama teacher, reprising her role from Love, Simon (season 1)
 Terri Hoyos as Natalia Salazar, Victor's grandmother (season 1)
 Juan Carlos Cantu as Tito Salazar, Victor's grandfather (season 1)
 Jason Collins as himself, playing basketball with a group of gay men (season 1)
 Josh Duhamel as Jack Spier, Simon Spier's father, reprising his role from Love, Simon (season 2)
 Daniel Croix as Tyler, Mia's friend she met at a college function (season 2)
 Kevin Rahm as Charles Campbell, Benji's father (season 2–3)
 Sean O'Bryan as Father Lawrence, the pastor of the Salazar's church (season 2) 
 Embeth Davidtz (season 2) and Amy Pietz (season 3) as Margaret Campbell, Benji's mother
 Nicholas Hamilton as Charlie, an online crush of Rahim's (season 2)
 Carlie Hanson as a bandmate of Benji's (season 2)
 Artemis Pebdani as Rahim's mother (season 3)
 Tracie Thoms as Naomi, Mia's estranged mother (season 3)
 Nia Vardalos as Theresa, a parent Isabel and Armando meet at a PFLAG meeting (season 3)
 Eureka O'Hara as herself, performing at a gay bar (season 3)
 Joshua Colley as Liam, a closeted gay student at Victor's school (season 3)

Episodes

Series overview

Season 1 (2020)

Season 2 (2021)

Season 3 (2022)

Production

Development
In April 2019, Disney+ gave the 20th Century Fox Television–produced showbased on the film Love, Simona straight-to-series order, with the writers of the original movie, Isaac Aptaker and Elizabeth Berger, attached as showrunners. The show would focus on brand new characters and would be set in the same world as the movie.

In February 2020, the series was retitled Love, Victor and moved to Hulu, with a scheduled premiere date in June 2020, making it the second seriesafter High Fidelityto move from Disney+ to Hulu. In April 2020, it was announced that the series was scheduled to premiere on June 19, 2020. On June 10, 2020, the premiere date was moved up to June 17, 2020, to give Juneteenth its own day in the spotlight. On August 7, 2020, Hulu renewed the series for a second season which premiered on June 11, 2021, and consists of 10 episodes. On July 30, 2021, Hulu renewed the series for a third season. On February 8, 2022, Hulu announced that the third season will be its last.

Casting
In June 2019, Ana Ortiz was cast as Isabel. In mid-August, the series' full cast was announced, with Michael Cimino as the lead, Victor. Also announced were James Martinez as Armando, Isabella Ferreira as Pilar, Mateo Fernandez as Adrian, Johnny Sequoyah as Mia, Bebe Wood as Lake, George Sear as Benji, Anthony Turpel as Felix, and Mason Gooding as Andrew. It was also announced that Nick Robinson, who starred in the film, would produce and narrate the series. Later that month, it was reported that Rachel Hilson had been cast as Mia, replacing Sequoyah. The recast was made in order to take the character in a new creative direction. On October 23, 2019, it was also announced that Sophia Bush had been cast as Veronica, Mia's father's new girlfriend.

In November 2020, Betsy Brandt was announced as having been cast in the second as Dawn, Felix's mother, who struggles with mental health issues. Ava Capri and Anthony Keyvan were also announced as joining the second-season cast. In March 2022, Nico Greetham was booked in a recurring role for the final season.

Filming 
Filming began in August 2019, in Los Angeles, with Amy York Rubin directing the first episode. Filming for the second season began on November 9, 2020. Filming for the third season began on November 8, 2021.

Music
The soundtrack EP for the first season, featuring three new songs by LGBT artists and all co-written by Leland, was released on June 19, 2020, by Hollywood Records.
The soundtrack album for the second season, featuring eight new songs by LGBT artists and all co-written by Leland, was released on June 11, 2021, by Hollywood Records.
The soundtrack EP for the third and final season, featuring three new songs by LGBT artists and all co-written and produced by Leland, was released on June 15, 2022, by Hollywood Records. The EP also includes a cover of the 1982 hit "Only You" by Yazoo.

Release
The series premiered on June 17, 2020, pushed up from a June 19 release date, on Hulu in the United States. Internationally, the series premiered on Disney+ under the dedicated streaming hub Star on February 23, 2021. The second season was released on June 11, 2021, on Hulu and premiered internationally on June 18, 2021, on Disney+'s Star. On Disney+, the first two seasons episodes premiered on a weekly basis.

The 8-episode third and final season was released on June 15, 2022. On that date, Love, Victor was also made available in the United States on Disney+. Internationally, the complete season was released simultaneously on Disney+'s Star.

Reception

Audience viewership
According to Whip Media's viewership tracking app TV Time, Love, Victor was the most anticipated new television series during the month of June 2021 and was the top show on the rise, based on the week-over-week growth in episodes watched for a specific program, during the week ending June 21, 2020. According to Hulu, the series was the most-watched drama on the service during its premiere week between June 17 and 23, 2020. It was also the most-binged original drama series on Hulu in 2020 during its first week and the second-most binged original on Hulu after Solar Opposites.

Critical response
For the first season, review aggregator Rotten Tomatoes reported an approval rating of 90% based on 49 reviews, with an average rating of 7.13/10. The website's critics consensus reads, "Michael Cimino charms in Love, Victor, a sincere and sweet—if safe—spin-off with a lot of heart." Metacritic gave the series a weighted average score of 69 out of 100, based on 21 critics, indicating "generally favorable reviews".

The second season has a 100% approval rating on Rotten Tomatoes, with an average score of 8.1/10 based on 23 reviews. The website's critics consensus states, "Grounded by its talented cast, Love, Victor grows into itself with a mature second season that confronts difficult situations with care."

The third season holds an 87% approval rating on Rotten Tomatoes, with an average score of 7.8/10 based on 15 reviews. The website's critics consensus states, "Love, Victor signs off with a valentine to its viewers, delivering a gentle denouement full of grace notes."

Accolades

Notes

References

External links
 
 

2020 American television series debuts
2022 American television series endings
2020s American high school television series
2020s American LGBT-related drama television series
2020s American romantic comedy television series
2020s American teen drama television series
English-language television shows
Coming-of-age television shows
Gay-related television shows
Hispanic and Latino American television
Hulu original programming
Live action television shows based on films
Television series about families
Television series about teenagers
Television series based on American novels
Television series by 20th Century Fox Television
Television shows filmed in Los Angeles
Television shows set in Atlanta
Bisexuality-related television series